Binneman is a surname. Notable people with the surname include:

Dirkie Binneman (1918–1959), South African cyclist
Hennie Binneman (1914–1968), South African cyclist